Cyan Banister (born 1977) is an American angel investor and entrepreneur. She is a partner at Long Journey Ventures, an early stage venture capital fund. She was an early investor in Uber, Niantic, Postmates, DeepMind, Carta, Thumbtack, Flexport, Affirm, and SpaceX, and co-founded Zivity, an adult-themed social networking site. Banister was the first woman investing partner at the venture capital Founders Fund, where she led seed and early-stage investments.

Early life and education 
Banister grew up in Arizona. At the age of 15 she experienced homelessness and dropped out of high school. Banister spoke publicly about her early life at the 2018 TechCrunch Disrupt conference, from living on the streets to becoming a venture capitalist, crediting her success to incrementalism, capitalism, individualism, mentorship, and endless curiosity. She credited being obsessed with making more money — capitalism — as being what eventually saved her life.

Career 
Banister started her career in non-executive positions at NBCUniversal, where she worked in systems administration and development support from 1999 to 2001. She was as a contributing writer to TechCrunch. Her first executive position was at the security startup IronPort in 2003.

A self-taught engineer, Banister held several management roles at IronPort, which was sold to Cisco for $850 million in 2007. According to The Wall Street Journal, she found herself with money from the acquisition that she didn't know what to do with. She considered putting it in the stock market or in land, but settled on startups. The first check she wrote as an angel investor was to SpaceX." Banister invested early in several companies worth more than a billion dollars, including Uber, Affirm, Opendoor, and Postmates.

In late 2007, with her husband Scott Banister and Jeffrey Wescott, she co-founded Zivity, a photography platform company, and in 2010 added nude photos of herself to Zivity's premium section. She served as editor-in-chief until March 2016, when she became the first woman partner at Founders Fund, a Silicon Valley venture capital fund. At Founders Fund Banister has invested in companies like Niantic and HQ Trivia. She is also a co-founder of Thankroll.

Founders Fund partner Brian Singerman wrote, "Our team has known Cyan for years and we've been continually impressed by her ability to identify some of the most impactful technology companies in the world at the earliest stages." Polina Marinova of Fortune wrote, "It's difficult to describe Banister as she does not fit perfectly in any box..." Marinova added that Shrug Capital founder Niv Dror said, "She likes to invest in weird things, sees things super early and just gets it."

In March, 2020, Banister announced that she was leaving Founders Fund to join Long Journey Ventures to get back into angel investing.

Personal life and political ideology  
She lives with her husband Scott Banister in San Francisco. She identifies as a socially liberal libertarian, and came out in 2016 as genderqueer.

The day after Donald Trump in a presidential debate told the Proud Boys, a far-right group with a history of inciting violence, to "stand back and stand by," Banister tweeted that the group was misunderstood and had "a few bad apples who've claimed to be part of their org but in general not true."

In 2021, Banister had a Twitter account called “Recall Chesa Boudin” that argued progressive District Attorney Chesa Boudin of San Francisco should be recalled. She donated $10,000 to a GoFundMe account started by Uber investor Jason Calacanis whose goal was to hire a researcher to investigate Boudin's office.

On August 23, 2021, interviewed on The Ingraham Angle by Laura Ingraham, Banister said, "More and more people are reaching out to me, wondering what it takes to own a firearm in San Francisco. And we don't have concealed carry permits, we don't have very good gun laws at all. And so we are allowed to defend our homes, but if we were to do that, if I were in a situation where I defended my home, what's going to happen to me?"

Awards and honors 
Cyan and Scott Banister won the Angel of the Year Crunchie award at the 2016 TechCrunch ceremonies. Jessi Hempel of Wired wrote that Banister is "an accomplished angel investor who, along with her husband, won TechCrunch's Angel of the Year award last spring for prescient bets on SpaceX, Uber, and DeepMind Technologies."

In 2015, Eugene Volokh announced that the UCLA First Amendment Amicus Brief Clinic would be renamed the Scott & Cyan Banister First Amendment Clinic, "in recognition of the Banisters' very generous gift in support of the clinic."

See also 
 List of venture capital firms
 Seed funding
 Venture capital financing

References

External links 
 

1977 births
21st-century American businesspeople
Venture capitalists
Living people
Businesspeople from Tucson, Arizona
American libertarians
21st-century American businesswomen